City of Winnipeg may refer to:
 Winnipeg, a city in Manitoba, Canada
Government of Winnipeg
 City of Winnipeg (HBC vessel), a steamship that operated on rivers in the Canadian prairies